Miya Patan (Nepali: मिया पाटान) is the residential area which is located in Ward number 13 of Pokhara Metropolitan City in Nepal. Aqsa Masjid is located near this place.

Office 
Ward 13 Office : Ward 13 office is situated at Miya Patan.

References 

Neighbourhoods in Pokhara